Tinshill (pronounced Tins-hill) is a district of Leeds, 4 miles (7 km) north of Leeds city centre, West Yorkshire, England. It was the Danes in the 9th century who named the hill "Tyndr's Hyll".   

The district is in the Weetwood ward of Leeds City Council. It is situated between Horsforth and Cookridge. When the estate was planned in the 1940s it was originally known as the 'Cookridge Tower Estate'. The estate predated surrounding estates such as Ireland Wood and Moor Grange. Holt Park came many years later and provided many facilities such as an Asda supermarket, shopping centre, leisure centre and secondary school.

The area was mainly made up of council-owned social housing although a growing number of these houses are now privately owned. It is near to the Tinshill BT Tower also known as the Cookridge Tower, one of the highest points in the city. Horsforth railway station is closer to Tinshill than Horsforth; the station is on the Cookridge side of the Moseley beck.

Tinshill is made up of a mix of former and current local authority housing, as well as many privately built houses that were constructed around the time Tinshill estate was being developed. (Leodis Photograph )  A number of blocks of brick built council flats were also incorporated, dating from around a similar time.

Transportation
Tinshill & Cookridge Social Club & Institute (a Working Mens Club) on Woodnook Drive is the terminus of the First Leeds bus service number 19a, a route known as the "Pink Line". The number 6 bus route, the "Sky Blue Line", also runs through Tinshill. Route 19a from Tinshill runs via - Headingley Stadium - Leeds city centre - York Road - Colton Sainsbury's. Route 6 runs from Holt Park - Cookridge - Tinshill - Weetwood - Headingley - University of Leeds to Leeds City Bus Station.

See also
Listed buildings in Leeds (Weetwood Ward)

References

External links

 Tinshill was in this parish

Places in Leeds